Dorotheea Petre (born 9 January 1981) is a Romanian actress. She won a special jury award for best actress at the Cannes Film Festival in 2006 for her performance as Eva Matei in The Way I Spent the End of the World.

Early life
She graduated in acting from the National Academy of Theater and Cinematographic Arts, "Ion Luca Caragiale" of Bucharest, Romania in 2006.

Filmography

List of awards and nominations 
2009: Magna Graecia Film Festival - Best Actress

2006: Cannes Film Festival - Special Jury Award for Best Actress, Un Certain Regard

2007: Medal of the Cultural Merit in the rank of Knight awarded by the Romanian President

2007: Critics' and Journalists' Society: Best Actress of the Year

2007: GOPO Award: Best Actress Award

2007: UCIN Award: Best Actress Award

2006: "Marea Neagra" Film Festival: Best Actress Award

2006: "Mannheim-Heidelberg" International Film Festival: Special Jury Award

2005: TIFF: Best Debut Award

References

External links
 

1981 births
Living people
Romanian film actresses
21st-century Romanian actresses
Actresses from Bucharest
Caragiale National University of Theatre and Film alumni